Spurgeons is a large national children's charity in the United Kingdom, working with vulnerable families, children and young people. It is based in Rushden, with several offices in the UK, and is a registered charity.

Spurgeons currently delivers more than 81 projects reaching over 37,000 children and 78,000 parents or carers every year. It aims to find long-lasting solutions to the challenges they face – including poverty, abuse problems, offending, and other social issues.

The Christian charity works in partnership with local authorities, churches, charitable foundations and other supporters to bring about lasting change.

History of Stockwell Orphanage 1867 to Spurgeons 2005
Spurgeons was founded in 1867 by Charles Haddon Spurgeon. as Stockwell Orphanage - due to its location.

The inspiration for starting an orphanage came from a visit with George Muller. and then spurred on by a donation of £20,000 by Anne Hillyard. However, it wasn't this £20,000 that was used to fund the beginning of the orphanage. Spurgeon records in the 1876 publicationThe Metropolitan Tabernacle. Its History and Works that the gift was railway debentures and a 'financial panic' meant that they couldn't be realised. Spurgeon then records that others gave to allow the land to be bought and houses to be built.

This involvement of individuals in the Orphanage continued throughout Spurgeon's life. In each monthly Sword and Trowel he recorded the gifts given. In the issue of December 1889 Spurgeon records that between October 15 and November 14 158 separate individuals, 275 collectors and 15 Orphanage choir appearances netted £797/12/1. This opened for boys in 1867 and for girls in 1879.

The orphanage continued in London until they were bombed in the Second World War.  The orphanage changed its name to Spurgeon's Child Care in 1937, and again in 2005 to Spurgeons.

Spurgeons was founded as a compassionate and distinctively
Christian response to the plight of orphaned and vulnerable children in London.
Motivated by their faith, Charles Haddon Spurgeon and his associates sought to
provide shelter, education and a loving environment for the city's most
vulnerable children.

The orphanage was founded on the 'family principle' which was viewed positively in 1878 by the Government report authored by Mouat and Bowly:
” – The Stockwell Orphanage, founded by the Rev. C. H. Spurgeon, is an institution of a higher order than the reformatories and pauper schools, and is not an industrial school properly so called. It is devoted to the education and training of fatherless boys, and is supported entirely by voluntary contributions in money or kind. The feature which caused us to visit it with reference to the present inquiry is that it is based on the family system, there being eight separate houses, in each of which resides a group of about thirty boys under the special charge of a matron. Each house contains dormitories for the boys, and apartments for the matron, also a lavatory, and the usual offices; but the meals are taken in a general dining hall, and cooked in a general kitchen; an arrangement which doubtless conduces to economy, but which is to some extent departure from the ideal family system. “The boys’ houses are arranged in a continuous terrace, each house being separated from the next by a party wall as in an ordinary street, the schoolrooms are on a third floor over a portion of the terrace, and are commodious and airy. The standard of education is high, as one of the avowed purposes of the institution is to get the boys ‘to take good positions in the world.’ There is a general play-hall and swimming bath, and it was stated to us that nearly every boy was able to swim. “The standard of health is high; there is no general contagious disease in the school, and infectious fevers, when they occur, are easily prevented from spreading by early isolation, in the convenient detached infirmary standing at the southeast end of the playground. “The institution has been ten years at work, and the boys placed out in situations during that time have, as a rule, turned out well. “In many respects, this excellent school affords no ground of comparison with pauper institutions; but the point to be specially noted is that the family system, even in the modified form here adopted, is stated to have been productive of undoubtedly good effects, not only as regards the formation of individual character, but also as conducting to a high standard of bodily health.”

The original orphanage, in Stockwell, opened in 1869 for
fatherless boys until ten years later when girls were welcomed to the
orphanage. At this point there were 500 children living there.

In 1892 Charles Spurgeon died, however his work continued to
improve the lives of the children in the orphanage.

In 1939, when the Second World War was announced, the
children living in the Stockwell orphanage had to be evacuated. The majority of
the children were moved to St David's in Reigate, Surrey.

After the war the children briefly stayed at St David's as
they were unable to return to Stockwell Orphanage due to the bomb damage.

In 1951 the home in Birchington, Kent was opened and became
the new children's home for Spurgeons. 
By 1953 all of the children had been relocated to the new home.

The children's home remained opened until 1979 when the
children were sent to smaller homes or foster families.

From 1991 Spurgeons carried out international work in
Romania, Kenya, Nigeria and Moldova. This international work was passed onto
other organisations in 2011.

Children's Centres

Spurgeons runs over 50 Children's Centres across the UK. Children's centres are a key resource in local communities.

The centres give Spurgeons the opportunity to work with children and families in the context of a local community and ensure they support all families regardless of background or situation.

Working with children in the early years of their life is the most effective way to ensure that those experiencing deprivation can still look forward to choices and opportunities.
Focusing on communities with high-levels of poverty, Spurgeons work with families at the pre-natal stage, through birth and up to the age of five.

Their services include: 
 Young parents groups
 Supporting parent and child relationships, family therapy and nurturing
 Baby clinics
 Stay and play sessions
 Father support groups

Young Carers
Family circumstances mean that from an early age some
children and young people provide regular or ongoing care and support to
another family member as a result of them having a physical or mental illness,
a disability, or are struggling with substance misuse. Young carers often take
on practical and/or emotional caring responsibilities that would normally be
expected of an adult.

Spurgeons know that these children and young people need
help to overcome the challenges they face. They work in partnership with other
agencies to support young carers and young adult carers (18-25), individually
and within their families in a range of ways.

Their services include:
 Information, advice and practical help for the family
 Educational, training and homework support
 One-to-one tailored support
 Transition support
 Mentoring support

Families and Criminal Justice
Many children, overwhelmed by their problems, act-up or act
out in a bid for attention or a cry for help. Children seen as 'trouble-makers'
may become isolated or be excluded from mainstream schooling. When this happens
the risk of them becoming involved in criminal activity grows. They face the
challenges of drugs, bullying, abuse, poverty and family breakdown alone - sometimes
because their own parents are in prison.

The impact a parent's imprisonment has on their children is
not fully known. But Spurgeons believes that it is crucial to help children to
address the root-causes of their problems, support children and their families
while they have a family member in prison and ensure they break the cycle of
imprisonment within families.

In partnership with the police, schools, social workers and
Youth Offending teams, Spurgeons supports families at times of crisis and provide
one-to-one mentoring and befriending for children.

Spurgeons run child focused visitors centres in a number of
prisons. These include:
 HMP Belmarsh
 HMP Brixton
 HMP Feltham
 HMP Isis
 HMP Woodhill
 HMP Pentonville
 HMP Wandsworth
 HMP Wormwood Scrubs
 HMP Winchester
The visitors centres ensure children have the most safe and
comfortable experience when they visit a parent in prison.

Spurgeons also offers targeted programmes for young
offenders or those at risk of offending – including mentoring for young people
in custody, through the gate, and family based intervention to prevent
offending and reoffending.

Invisible Walls
Spurgeons
also provide a project called ‘Invisible Walls’. Spurgeons’ Invisible Walls
family support service is based at HMP/YOI Winchester, a local Category B/C
prison. The service works in partnership with the prison and a range of
agencies to support fathers in custody and their families in a range of ways.

1. Support for visiting...

A key part of the service is the Visitors’ Centre, which acts as a hub for family support, and offers comprehensive access to information about local services within families’ communities. The 7-day-a-week service is supported by a large volunteer workforce who are trained and understand the needs that children and families visiting prison may experience.
2. Support for fathers inside...

Within the prison, Invisible Walls offers a range of parenting support to fathers, including parenting programmes and Family Days, to assist them develop and maintain healthy relationships with their families wherever possible, both during custody and on release into the community. Invisible Walls acts as a bridging service to help meet the resettlement needs of fathers and their families on release as part of a multi-agency response.
3. Work with agencies outside...

Invisible Walls works in partnership with Local Authorities’ family support services and social care, to deliver tailored packages of pre- and post-release support for the whole family. The service is a key provider of Hidden Sentence training to partner agencies and organisations across Hampshire and the surrounding area, helping them to understand the impact of having a family member in prison. Invisible Walls also has well-established links with local universities and community organisations through which the service recruits and trains a large cohort of volunteers to help support prisoners’ families.

Family Support
Spurgeons is an experienced provider of services for families with
multiple needs. They deliver a range of programmes to achieve positive change
for families and clear outcomes for commissioners.

Spurgeons provide cost effective high quality planned programmes in order
to meet the needs of troubled families. They provide planned programmes to meet
the complex needs of troubled families including key issues such as substance
misuse, mental health and offending. Their programmes provide holistic support,
co-ordinating multi-agency work around the family unit.

They recognise
that one of the most effective ways to reach vulnerable young people is by
working with them in their own community. By establishing dialogue with
children and young people most at risk of deprivation, Spurgeons can better
understand them and better help their community to find solutions to the
challenges they face.

The aim is
to facilitate them in doing this through training, support and
skills-enhancement.

These
activities are designed to help people to deal with issues like
inter-generational breakdown and anti-social behaviour and can help to build
stronger families and healthier and more cohesive communities.

Spurgeons
provides activities such as parenting support, youth and children's activities,
community events and homework clubs.

They also
offer child contact services. Contact centres are meeting places where children
from separated families can enjoy contact with one (or both) parents and/or
other family members in a comfortable and safe environment. Visits are tailored
around the needs of each child. It is estimated that 2,000 children in the UK
use Child Contact Centres each week.

Independent
visitors services is another service Spurgeons provides through family support.
Children and young people being looked after by the local authority can benefit
from the friendship and advice offered by a Spurgeons volunteer. All volunteers
are fully trained to mentor and befriend a looked after child or young person.

References

External links
Spurgeons website

1867 establishments in England
Charities based in Northamptonshire
Rushden
Children's charities based in the United Kingdom